Sir William Ewart Bell (13 November 1924 - 2 January 2001) was an Irish Rugby Union player and civil servant who became a Rugby Union administrator later in life.  He was President of the Irish Rugby Football Union (IRFU) and Chair of the 1995 Rugby World Cup. He was Permanent Secretary at the United Kingdom Northern Ireland Office from 1979–84, a time marked by Republican hunger strikes.

Early life 

Ewart Bell was born in Belfast to Rev. Dr. Frederick George Bell, a Presbyterian minister. His mother was a teacher, and he was the eldest of three children. He attended Methodist College Belfast, where he was Head Boy and Captain of the Rugby First XV. He attended Wadham College, Oxford, where he studied mathematics. In 1946 he went to Cheltenham College where he taught mathematics.

Civil Service 

In 1948 he joined the Ministry of Health in the Northern Ireland Government. He moved in 1952 to the Ministry of Commerce, where he was assistant secretary (1962) and secretary (1970). He led the diversification of Northern Ireland's economy into areas including pharmaceuticals and chemical manufacturing thus reducing dependence on textiles, ship manufacturing and agriculture. He was appointed Permanent Secretary at the Department of Finance in  1976 and became Head of the Northern Ireland Civil Service in 1979. He retained this position until 1984.

He was admitted to the KCB in 1982.

Rugby Union 

Bell played Rugby Union for Oxford University, Cheltenham, Collegians and Ulster. In 1953 he made his international debut for Ireland against France. He played all four Five Nations matches for Ireland that year.

Following retirement he became involved in rugby administration. He was president of the Ulster Branch of the Irish Rugby Football Union, a member of the IRFU Committee, and its president in 1986–1987. He went on to be a member and subsequently Chair of the International Rugby Board. He was appointed President of the Rugby World Cup in 1993, where he presided over the 1995 Rugby World Cup in South Africa.

References 

Article in the Irish Dictionary of Biography  (by subscription)

External links

Profile at Irish Rugby

1924 births
2001 deaths
Alumni of the University of Oxford
Collegians Football Club players
Heads of the Northern Ireland Civil Service
Ireland international rugby union players
Irish rugby union players
Oxford University RFC players
People educated at Methodist College Belfast
Rugby union players from Belfast
Ulster Rugby players